Pavel Kapitonovic Makarov (26 January 1919 — 1963) was a footballer who played as a midfielder in the Soviet Union, Austria, Germany, England, France and Canada.

Career
Makarov began his career in 1936, playing for Soviet club Dynamo Rostov-on-Don. In his first two seasons at the club, Makarov helped the club gain promotion from the Soviet Second League and the Soviet First League. Makarov made 22 league appearances for Dynamo Rostov-on-Don, scoring four times, in the 1938 Soviet Top League season as the club finished 18th and were relegated back to the First League. In 1940, Makarov signed for Dynamo Kharkiv, before joining Spartak Leningrad.

In World War II, Makarov joined the Soviet 285th Rifle Division, before being captured by the Germans where he worked voluntarily in the Sonderkommandos. As the war finished, Makarov played for Austrian club SK Ukraine Salzburg.

Following the culmination of World War II, Makarov joined German clubs Stuttgarter Kickers and Phönix Karlsruhe. Makarov played 18 times, scoring once, in the Oberliga Süd for Phönix Karlsruhe. Makarov's time in Germany was followed by spells at Berkut Ulm and SSV Ulm 1846.

In October 1948, Makarov signed for English non-league club Chelmsford City. Makarov played for the club four times, scoring three goals, before dropping down to the reserves.

In 1949, Makarov signed for Ligue 2 club Nîmes. Makarov played 29 times, scoring three goals, helping the club gain promotion to Ligue 1. Following promotion, Makarov appeared for Nîmes three times in the 1950–51 French Division 1. In 1951, Makarov signed for Grenoble, playing 11 times over the course of three seasons.

In 1954, Makarov moved to Canada, playing for Toronto Ukrainians before returning to France to sign for USM Montargis. In 1957, Makarov signed for US Viesly, becoming manager of the club in the process. Makarov's playing career was finished by a spell at FC Vauverdois.

Personal life
Makarov used a number of aliases during his career, including Pawel Makar, Paul Makar and D. Makarpauu. Makarov gained French citizenship in 1949 and died in the country in 1963.

References

1919 births
1963 deaths
Association football midfielders
Soviet footballers
Soviet Top League players
Soviet First League players
Southern Football League players
Ligue 2 players
Ligue 1 players
Stuttgarter Kickers players
Karlsruher SC players
SSV Ulm 1846 players
Chelmsford City F.C. players
Nîmes Olympique players
Grenoble Foot 38 players
Toronto Ukrainians players
Soviet football managers
Sonderkommando
World War II prisoners of war held by Germany
Expatriate footballers in Austria
Expatriate footballers in Germany
Expatriate footballers in England
Expatriate footballers in France
Expatriate soccer players in Canada